Among the Great Apes with Michelle Yeoh is a 2009 documentary film made by National Geographic   in cooperation with  FINAS (National Film Development Corporation Malaysia). The film is notable for showing how the Sepilok Orangutan Rehabilitation Centre (also known as Sepilok Orang Utan Sanctuary) in Sabah is fighting for the survival and well-being of each ape. The film was broadcast internationally and presented at the Eco-Knights Film Festival 2011.

Synopsis
In the documentary, Michelle Yeoh visits her adopted orangutan in her home country Malaysia and studies for three weeks what is done to sustain the long-term population of this endangered species. Guided by Dr Cecilia Boklin, Yeoh takes part in all activities; she is filmed nurturing an orphaned suckling orangutan.

Accolades
Best Natural History or Wildlife Programme or Docu-drama, Asian Television Awards 2010
Best Environmental/Tourism Documentary, Malaysian Documentary Awards 2010

References

External links
FINAS homepage on Among the Great Apes with Michelle Yeoh
Orang Utan Outreach on Among the Great Apes with Michelle Yeoh

2009 films
Animal welfare
2009 documentary films
American documentary television films
Documentary films about nature
Films shot in Malaysia
English-language Malaysian films
Films about apes
2000s English-language films